The United States N-class submarines were a class of seven coastal defense submarines built for the United States Navy during World War I.

Description
The boats were constructed by two companies to slightly different specifications; N-1, N-2, and N-3 were designed by the Electric Boat Company of Groton, Connecticut and built by the Seattle Construction and Drydock Company of Seattle, Washington, and N-4, N-5, N-6, and N-7 were designed and built by the Lake Torpedo Boat Company of Bridgeport, Connecticut. The N-boats built by Lake are sometimes considered a separate class.

They displaced  on the surface and  submerged. The N-class submarines had a crew of 2 officers and 23 enlisted men.

They displaced  on the surface and  submerged. The N-class submarines had a crew of 3 officers and 26 enlisted men.

For surface running, the Electric Boat submarines were powered by two  diesel engines, each driving one propeller shaft. When submerged each propeller was driven by a  electric motor. The Lake boats had  diesels and  motors. Regardless of designer, the N-class submarines could reach  on the surface and  underwater.

The boats were armed with four 18-inch (450 mm) torpedo tubes in the bow. They carried four reloads, for a total of eight torpedoes. They were the last submarines to be designed without a deck gun until 1946.

This class was the first US Navy submarine class completed with metal bridge shields. These had been omitted from previous classes to increase underwater speed. These classes used piping-and-canvas temporary bridges for extended surface runs; these were found to be inadequate on North Atlantic patrols in World War I. All forward-deployed submarines were back-fitted with metal "chariot" bridge shields during the war. The coastal patrol nature of the small N-class submarines was emphasized by their lack of a deck gun.

Ships in class
The seven submarines of the N-class were:

Service
Commissioned after the American entry into World War I, they were assigned to the 1st Naval District, primarily operating from Naval Submarine Base New London with some boats operating out of New York City at times, all patrolling the New England coast.

By 1922 the Seattle boats were assigned to the Submarine School, New London, while the Lake boats (sometimes called the N-4 class) were all scrapped in that year, their engines having been removed in 1921 to re-equip some of the L class. The Seattle boats were decommissioned in 1926 and scrapped in 1931 to comply with the limits of the London Naval Treaty.

Notes

References

 
 
 Silverstone, Paul H., U.S. Warships of World War I (Ian Allan, 1970), .
 Navsource.org early diesel submarines page
 Pigboats.com N-boats page

Submarine classes
 
 N class